Donald Mark Petrie (born April 2, 1954) is an American film director and actor.

Life and career
Petrie was born in New York City, New York, the son of Dorothea (née Grundy), a television producer, actor, and novelist, and Daniel Petrie, a director. He is the brother of writer Daniel Petrie, Jr.
Petrie began his entertainment career as an actor, having trained and graduated from California State Northridge as a theatre major.  Donald soon was appearing in many television episodes.  In 1980, Donald decided to shift his focus to directing when he was accepted as a Fellow at the American Film Institute. 

Petrie has acted and guest-starred on television programs since 1976.

Filmography
Films
 Mystic Pizza (1988)
 Opportunity Knocks (1990)
 Grumpy Old Men (1993)
 The Favor (1994)
 Richie Rich (1994)
 The Associate (1996)
 My Favorite Martian (1999)
 Miss Congeniality (2000)
 How to Lose a Guy in 10 Days (2003)
 Welcome to Mooseport (2004)
 Just My Luck (2006) (Also producer)
 My Life in Ruins (2009)
 Atlantic Gold (2013)
 Little Italy (2018)

TV movies
 Why on Earth? (1988)
 Turner & Hooch (1990)
 Country Estates (1993)

TV series

References

External links

1954 births
American male film actors
American film directors
American people of Canadian descent
American male television actors
American television directors
Living people
Male actors from New York City
Comedy film directors